Abdennour Merzouki (born February 15, 1992) is an Algerian footballer who last played for RC Arbaâ in the Algerian Ligue Professionnelle 1.

Merzouki was part of the Algeria national under-17 football team that finished as runner-ups at the 2009 African U-17 Championship. Merzouki made his professional debut for RC Arbaâ on November 6, 2015, in a 3-1 win over NA Hussein Dey.

References

External links
 

1992 births
Algerian footballers
Algerian Ligue Professionnelle 1 players
Living people
Footballers from Algiers
JSM Béjaïa players
JS Kabylie players
USM Alger players
RC Arbaâ players
Association football goalkeepers
Algeria youth international footballers
21st-century Algerian people